Calanthe tricarinata is a species of orchid native to Japan (including the Ryukyu Islands), Korea, China (Gansu, Guizhou, Hubei, Shaanxi, Sichuan, Taiwan, Tibet, Yunnan), Northeastern India, Bhutan, Assam, Nepal, Kashmir, Myanmar and Thailand.

References

External links 
 
 

tricarinata
Flora of China
Flora of Eastern Asia
Flora of the Indian subcontinent
Flora of Myanmar
Flora of Thailand
Orchids of China
Orchids of India
Orchids of Nepal
Orchids of Japan
Flora of Bhutan